Stilo is a town and comune in the province of Reggio Calabria, in the Calabria region of southern Italy.

The town is inscribed into I Borghi più belli d'Italia list.

The economy of the commune is mainly based on agriculture, with production of cereals, oil, wine and cheese. There are mines of iron and lead.

At  from the city is the promontory of Cape Stilo, near where in July 1940 the Battle of Punta Stilo was fought by the Italian and British navies.

History

The origins of Stilo are connected to the destruction of the ancient Greek colony of Caulonia by Dionysius II of Syracuse, followed by another by the Campanians (allies of the Romans) in 277 BC.

Main sights
The Cattolica di Stilo, a 9th-century church in the Byzantine style
The Shrine of Saint John the Therist (Diocese of Locri-Gerace)
Church of San Domenico
Church of San Nicola da Tolentino
The Norman Castle of Roger II
The Fountain of the Dolphins

Not far from the town is the monastery of San Giovanni Theristis.

People from Stilo 

Tommaso Campanella (Philosopher)
Francesco Cozza (Painter)

Gallery

See also 

Vallata dello Stilaro Allaro
Ecomuseo delle ferriere e fonderie di Calabria

References

Castles in Italy
Vallata dello Stilaro